Borša is a village and municipality in the Trebišov District in the Košice Region of eastern Slovakia. The village is famed as the birthplace of Francis II Rákóczi.

History
In historical records the village was first mentioned in 1221. Borša is the hometown of Francis II Rákóczi who was born here on 27 March 1676.

Rákóczi's castle in the village is being under reconstruction since 2018, serving as a museum.

Geography
The village lies at an altitude of 102 metres and covers an area of 9.54 km².
It has a population of about 1250 people.

Ethnicity
By the beginning of 20th century, the village had an absolute Hungarian majority. In census of 1910 during the period of Magyarization, the village had 783 inhabitants, of which 778 were Hungarians.

In the most recent Slovak census of 2011, 644 inhabitants were Slovaks (53.0%) and 545 were Hungarians (44.9%).

Facilities
The village has a public library and a football pitch.

Genealogical resources

The records for genealogical research are available at the state archive "Statny 
Archiv in Kosice, Slovakia"

 Reformated church records (births/marriages/deaths): 1758–1924 (parish B)

See also
 List of municipalities and towns in Slovakia

References

https://web.archive.org/web/20071116010355/http://www.statistics.sk/mosmis/eng/run.html
Surnames of living people in Borsa

Villages and municipalities in Trebišov District
Zemplín (region)